Thomas Stadium is a baseball venue in Johnson City, Tennessee, United States.  It is home to the East Tennessee State Buccaneers baseball team of the NCAA Division I Southern Conference.  Opened in 2012, the facility has a listed capacity of 1,000 spectators.  Features of the stadium include an LED video board, a FieldTurf playing surface, stadium lighting, berm seating, concessions, and restrooms.  The stadium replaced Howard Johnson Field as the home of East Tennessee State's baseball program.

The playing field at Thomas Stadium opened on February 17, 2012, when East Tennessee State defeated Eastern Kentucky 8–3 in front of 327 spectators.  The stadium itself opened on February 15, 2013 with a 6–4 loss to Penn State with 910 in attendance. The largest crowd to fill the stadium occurred on April 9, 2013, when 1,752 fans attended the Bucs' game versus Tennessee.

See also
 List of NCAA Division I baseball venues

References 

College baseball venues in the United States
Baseball venues in Tennessee
East Tennessee State Buccaneers baseball